Fred Cramer Gilchrist (June 2, 1868 – March 10, 1950) was a seven-term Republican U.S. Representative from Iowa, from 1931 to 1945.

Born in California, Pennsylvania, in Washington County, Pennsylvania, Gilchrist moved with his parents to Cedar Falls, Iowa, in 1871.
He attended the public schools. He graduated from State Teachers' College, Cedar Falls, Iowa, in 1886. From 1886 to 1890, he was a teacher and superintendent of two school districts in Pocahontas County, Iowa — Laurens, Iowa and Rolfe, Iowa. From 1890 to 1892 he served as that County's superintendent of schools. Leaving school administration for law school, he graduated from the University of Iowa College of Law at Iowa City in 1893, and was admitted to the bar that year. He then returned home and commenced private practice in Laurens.

He served as a member of the Iowa House of Representatives for one term, in 1902-1904. He also served as president of the board of education of Laurens from 1905 to 1928. Returning to legislative service, he served the Iowa Senate from 1923 to 1931.

Between 1930 and 1944, Gilchrist served seven terms as a Republican U.S. Representative from Iowa.  During his service, the size of Iowa's house delegation shrank from eleven (in 1931) to nine (in 1933) and then to eight (in 1943), requiring redistricting before the 1932 and 1942 elections. Thus, without ever changing addresses, Gilchrist represented three different congressional districts. In 1930, he ran for and won the seat in Iowa's 10th congressional district that L. J. Dickinson vacated in his successful run for the U.S. Senate.  Two years later, with his home county (Pocahontas) now in Iowa's 8th congressional district, Gilchrist was one of three Iowa Republican House candidates to survive the Roosevelt landslide. He was re-elected four more times from that district, only once (in 1934) in a close race.  In 1942, following the next redistricting, Pocahontas County was now in Iowa's 6th congressional district, where Gilchrist won re-election once.  However, in 1944, he was challenged for the Republican nomination by James I. Dolliver of Fort Dodge, Iowa. In a primary election characterized by low turnout, Dolliver defeated Gilchrist, and went on to win the general election. In all, Gilchrist served in Congress from March 4, 1931 to January 3, 1945.

Upon his return to Laurens, Gilchrist resumed the practice of law. He died in Laurens on March 10, 1950, and was interred in Laurens Cemetery.

References

1868 births
1950 deaths
People from California, Pennsylvania
Republican Party members of the Iowa House of Representatives
University of Northern Iowa alumni
People from Laurens, Iowa
People from Cedar Falls, Iowa
University of Iowa College of Law alumni
Schoolteachers from Iowa
Iowa lawyers
Republican Party Iowa state senators
Republican Party members of the United States House of Representatives from Iowa